The Devil You Know is an album by American singer-songwriter Rickie Lee Jones, released in September 2012 on Concord Records. It is a collection of cover songs and it was produced by Ben Harper.

Track listing
"Sympathy for the Devil" (Mick Jagger, Keith Richards) – 6:28 	
"Only Love Can Break Your Heart" (Neil Young) – 3:54 	
"Masterpiece" (Ben Harper) – 4:28 	
"The Weight" (Robbie Robertson) – 6:32 	
"St. James Infirmary" (Traditional) – 2:19 	
"Comfort You" (Van Morrison) – 3:13 	
"Reason to Believe" (Tim Hardin) – 5:18 	
"Play with Fire" (Jagger, Brian Jones, Richards, Charlie Watts, Bill Wyman) – 3:44 	
"Seems Like a Long Time" (Theodore Anderson) – 3:54 	
"Catch the Wind" (Donovan Leitch) – 2:36

Personnel
Rickie Lee Jones – vocals, guitar, piano, percussions
Ben Harper – guitar, bass, organ, drums, percussions, vibraphone, background vocals
Sheldon Gomberg – bass
Chris Joyner – organ
Jason Yates – organ
Larry Goldings – organ, piano
Jamie Elman – piano
Jesse Ingalls – piano
D. J. Bonebrake – vibraphone
David Lindley – violin

References

2012 albums
Rickie Lee Jones albums
Fantasy Records albums